Liberty High School is a public high school located in the city of Frisco, Texas, United States. It is classified as a 5A school by the UIL. It is a part of the Frisco Independent School District located in east central Collin County, and is currently one of ten high schools in the district. The school initially opened in 2006 in what is now Fowler Middle School and the following year opened in its own building on Rolater Road. In 2015, the school was rated "Met Standard" by the Texas Education Agency. It has a rivalry with Centennial High School, which the students refer to as the "Rolater Rumble”

Wingspan
Wingspan is Liberty High School's award winning website. The website has won multiple NSPA Pacemaker Awards among many others throughout the years. The editorial staff consists of students, working together with the rest of the staff. The editors for the 2020-2021 school year were Aaron Boehmer, Trisha Dasgupta, Shreya Jagan, Caroline Caruso, and Ana Cuen.  In 2015, the CSPA named it among the top 13 new high school sites in the nation.

Athletics

The Liberty Redhawks compete in the following sports:
State championships:
In 2017 the girls' cross country team won 5a state championship.
In 2020 the girls' varsity basketball team won the state championship over San Antonio Veterans Memorial High Schools 35-26.
 Baseball
 Basketball
 Cross Country
 Football
 Golf
 Powerlifting
 Soccer
 Softball
 Tennis
 Track and Field
 Swimming and Diving
 Volleyball
 Wrestling

Debate team
Liberty's speech and debate team has won district, regional, and state titles in Lincoln-Douglas Debate, Policy (CX) Debate, and Informative and Persuasive Extemporaneous Speaking, including UIL CX state qualifications in 2017 and 2018, as well as winning the 2018 5A State Championship title in Lincoln-Douglas Debate. Although occasionally participating in National Speech and Debate Association competitions, the team primarily competes in UIL.

Performing arts
Opportunities for students interested in performing arts include colorguard, band, Rockskool, orchestra, theatre, choir, dance team, and marching band.

Languages offered
Language courses offered include Chinese, Spanish and French. American Sign Language was offered in cooperation with nearby CHS but has since been discontinued.  German was once offered in cooperation with nearby CHS/HHS, but was discontinued in 2012.

Academic Decathlon
Since opening in 2006, Liberty has excelled at the United States Academic Decathlon. At state level, for the years of 06-07 and 07–08, the team won second place in the 3A division. In the 08-09 year, Liberty won state championship in the 4A division. During the 11-12 competition, it placed second in the regional round as well as 9th in the state round at San Antonio, Texas.

Notable alumni

 Sasha Lane (Class of 2014) - actress, American Honey
 Jay Ajayi (Class of 2011) - running back for the Philadelphia Eagles
 Keaton Parks (Class of 2015) - professional soccer player for New York City FC, member 2018 US Men's National Soccer Team

References

External links
 Liberty High School webpage
 Frisco Independent School District

High schools in Collin County, Texas
Educational institutions established in 2006
Frisco Independent School District high schools
Frisco, Texas
2006 establishments in Texas